Fairweather Johnson is the second studio album by American rock band Hootie & the Blowfish, released on April 23, 1996, through Atlantic Records. Three songs from the album were released as singles: "Old Man & Me", "Tucker's Town", and "Sad Caper". The album debuted at number one on the Billboard 200 in May 1996, while their debut, Cracked Rear View, was still in the charts. It has sold 2,361,000 copies in the US as of May 2012. Despite its initial success, sales tapered off quickly, and the album earned mixed reviews. It was included in Pitchfork Medias 2010 list of "ten career-killing albums" of the 1990s. Stylus Magazine shared sentiments, including it in their "Non-Definitive Guide to the Follow-Up", saying "really, everyone saw this one coming a mile off. Who was really gonna care about another Hootie album?"

Track listing
All songs written by Mark Bryan, Dean Felber, Darius Rucker and Jim "Soni" Sonefeld.
"Be the One" – 3:25
"Sad Caper" – 2:49
"Tucker's Town" – 3:45
"She Crawls Away" – 4:25
"So Strange" – 4:03
"Old Man & Me (When I Get to Heaven)" – 4:27
"Earth Stopped Cold at Dawn" – 3:27
"Fairweather Johnson" – 0:51
"Honeyscrew" – 3:36
"Let It Breathe" – 3:53
"Silly Little Pop Song" – 2:56
"Fool" – 3:05
"Tootie" – 3:04
"When I'm Lonely" – 5:34

PersonnelHootie & the BlowfishMark Bryan – background vocals, guitar, mandolin, piano
Dean Felber – background vocals, bass guitar
Darius Rucker – dobro, guitar, vocals
Jim Sonefeld – background vocals, drums, percussion, pianoOther musiciansDean Dinning – harmony vocals 
Nanci Griffith – harmony vocals 
Randy Guss – tambourine 
Lili Haydn – viola 
Peter Holsapple – accordion , Hammond organ , piano 
John Nau – Fender Rhodes , Hammond organ , piano 
Cary Phillips – infant roar 
Glen Phillips – harmony vocals 
Michael Severens – cello Production'
John Clark – photography 
Don Gehman – engineering, mixing, production
Ethan Hill – photography
Phyllis Leibowitz – stylist 
Benjamin Niles – art direction
Eddy Schreyer – mastering

Chart positions

References

1996 albums
Albums produced by Don Gehman
Atlantic Records albums
Hootie & the Blowfish albums